Lecithocera oxycona is a moth in the family Lecithoceridae. It was described by Edward Meyrick in 1910. It is found in southern India.

The wingspan is about 11 mm. The forewings are rather dark fuscous, somewhat pale sprinkled. There is a broad whitish-ochreous costal streak from the base to about three-fourths, attenuated to a point posteriorly. The discal stigmata are cloudy and dark fuscous. The hindwings are grey.

References

Moths described in 1910
oxycona